Red de Expresos Regionales (RER, English: Regional Express Network) is a planned mass transit system in Buenos Aires which will connect the main rail terminals of the city through  of tunnels with a central terminal. The tunnels will mean that the existing  commuter rail network will be connected, with passengers being able to travel from one part of Greater Buenos Aires and La Plata to the other while only making one change at the new underground central terminal. The project is modelled on the Réseau Express Régional in Paris. It is estimated that after the completion of the project, combined with the current renewal of the commuter rail lines' rolling stock, passenger numbers will double from 1.4 million passengers per day to 3 million.

History and Overview

The idea of linking the main commuter rail lines of Buenos Aires through a tunnel dates back to 1969, resulting in a 1973 study which suggested creating a Red Expresa Regional. While the original proposal sought to link the Mitre Line and Roca Line through the centre of the city, more recent proposals suggested creating tunnels between Retiro railway station, Once railway station and Constitución railway station - the three biggest rail terminals of the city.

Such a line would connect all urban and suburban commuter rail lines in the city, with the exception of the Urquiza Line which has access tunnels to Line B at of the Buenos Aires Underground Federico Lacroze railway station and the Belgrano Sur Line, whose inclusion in RER first depends on the current plans for the extension of the line to Constitución being completed.

The current RER proposal was put forward by Buenos Aires mayor Mauricio Macri in 2015.

The total cost of the project will be US$1.8 billion and will integrate the existing  network through the tunnels.

The first stage of the project will take four years to complete and consists of building the Obelisco station and the North-South tunnels from Retiro railway station to Constitución railway station, integrating the Mitre Line, Roca Line and San Martín Line. The second stage will take a further two years and will see the building of the East-West tunnels connecting Once railway station to the central station and the building of the Correo Central station, integrating the Sarmiento Line into the network. The final stage will take a further two years and will extend the Belgrano Sur Line to Constitución from its existing terminal using viaducts (a project already under way independently of RER) then build a new tunnel between Constitución and Retiro connecting the two metre gauge railways after they are electrified.

Perhaps the most notable omission from the project is the inclusion of the Urquiza Line whose terminal as at Federico Lacroze railway station in the West of the city. The line is distinctive from the other lines due to its standard gauge configuration since it was originally intended to be part of Line B of the Buenos Aires Underground. Urquiza Line trains without any modification could use the access tunnel at the Federico Lacroze underground station and travel through the line's tunnels to Carlos Pellegrini station which is where Line B would combine with RER regardless of the inclusion of the Urquiza line.

Challenges
The main challenges to the implementation of the RER network are found in the differing track gauges and state of electrification found in the different lines in Greater Buenos Aires:

Discounting the Urquiza Line which is not included in the project and which could easily be integrated into the Buenos Aires Underground, the problems are then found within the San Martín Line and the two Belgrano lines of the General Belgrano Railway. The San Martín Line, while sharing the same  as the majority of the network, currently uses diesel-electric CSR SDD7 rolling stock, however electrification of the line has now been planned for some time and the rolling stock would presumably be moved to other parts of the country. In 2015, the first studies on the line's electrification began, while the government announced that funding had been secured.

The Belgrano Sur and Belgrano Norte perhaps provide the biggest challenge since both have a different track gauge to the rest of the network and neither are electrified, with no immediate plans to carry out electrification at the time the RER project was announced. However, both lines are having their rolling stock replaced with electrification in mind, with the Belgrano Sur line using new CNR DMUs which have been designed to be easily converted to electric power, while the Belgrano Norte has a similar case with its new Argentine-made Emepa Alerce DMUs which are also designed to be easily converted.

Converting the gauge of the lines is out of the question, so there will be a separate North-South tunnel between Retiro and Constitución for the two lines. Since both lines have the lower traffic than the Sarmiento, Mitre and Roca lines and given the current lack of electrification, difference in gauge and necessary extension of the Belgrano Sur line to Constitución, the connection of these two lines to the RER network will be left to the third and final stage of its construction. Conversely, those three lines are the most straight forward especially considering that they all share the same CSR rolling stock.

Existing tunnels and connections

As noted, the Urquiza Line already has a connection to both future stations in the centre of the city through the use of Line B, though currently this connection is not made use of since services terminate at Federico Lacroze railway station and do not continue on underground.

Likewise, the Sarmiento Line and San Martín Line are connected by a one-track tunnel which runs through the city from the Sarmiento Line's terminus at Once railway station in what would be RER's trajectory to Puerto Madero, while a double-track segment connects the former Puerto Madero station with the San Martín Line's terminus at Retiro railway station. This route between the two lines has been traditionally used for freight services, though it was briefly used for passenger services to the centre of the city on the Sarmiento Line during the 1990s.

Similarly, the tracks of what was the Buenos Aires and Ensenada Port Railway and the Tranvia del Este provide a north-south connection through the Puerto Madero district, though today these areas have heavy road traffic and would be unsuitable for overground commuter rail.

See also
Rail transport in Argentina
Buenos Aires Underground

References

External links

 

Underground rapid transit in Argentina
Proposed railway lines in Argentina
Transport in Buenos Aires
Rail transport in Buenos Aires
Underground commuter rail